Philip Russell Diplock (November 1927 - July 2019) is a British architect. He is the founder of Russell Diplock & Associates

Early life
Philip Russell Diplock was born in November 1927, son of Philip Bernard Diplock (a manager at Capital and Counties Bank) and Elsie Margaret Diplock (née Besley - Born 1898, died 1976 - source Ancestry Family Tree.) His younger brother was Professor Anthony Diplock, former Chair of Biochemistry at Guys and Kings Medical School London.). Kenneth Diplock, Baron Diplock is a distant cousin.

Career
Diplock founded Russell Diplock & Associates, an architectural firm. It designed the 18-storey modernist Arlington House, Margate, which was built in 1964 by the contractors Bernard Sunley & Sons. They also designed numerous buildings in the Brighton area.

References

1927 births
20th-century British architects
Possibly living people
21st-century British architects